Perla Aguiar (born Perla Fernández Aguiar) is a Cuban actress, known especially for her roles in Mexican films during the Golden Age of Mexican cinema, such as The Genius (1948), The Devil Is a Woman (1950) and Chucho the Mended (1952).

Selected filmography
Jalisco Fair (1948)
The Genius (1948)
Autumn and Spring (1949)
The Devil Is a Woman (1950)
El revoltoso (1951)
Chucho the Mended (1952)
Dona Mariquita of My Heart (1953)

References

Bibliography
Abad, Gracia. Quién es quién en el teatro y el cine español e hispanoamericano. Vol. 1. Centro de Investigaciones Literarias Españolas e Hispanoamericanas (CILEH), BPR Publishers, 1990. 
Aviña, Rafael. Aquí está su pachucote— ¡Noooo!: una biografía de Germán Valdés. Dirección General de Publicaciones, Consejo Nacional para la Cultura y las Artes, 2009. 
Pilcher, Jeffrey M. Cantinflas and the Chaos of Mexican Modernity. Rowman & Littlefield, 2001.

External links

Year of birth unknown
Living people
Cuban film actresses
Mexican film actresses
20th-century Cuban actresses
20th-century Mexican actresses
Year of birth missing (living people)